Capronia is a genus of fungi in the family Herpotrichiellaceae. It has about 80 species.

Species
Capronia acutiseta 
Capronia albimontana 
Capronia amylacea 
Capronia andina 
Capronia apiculata 
Capronia arctica 
Capronia austrocedri 
Capronia baeomycetis 
Capronia borealis 
Capronia brabeji 
Capronia camelliae-yunnanensis 
Capronia capucina 
Capronia castlerockii 
Capronia chlorospora 
Capronia ciliomaris 
Capronia cogtii 
Capronia collapsa 
Capronia commonsii 
Capronia coronata 
Capronia dactylotricha 
Capronia dryadis 
Capronia epilobarina 
Capronia epimyces 
Capronia etayoi 
Capronia exigua 
Capronia fungicola 
Capronia fusispora 
Capronia glabra 
Capronia guatemalensis 
Capronia hafellneri 
Capronia holmiorum 
Capronia hypotrachynae 
Capronia inconspicua 
Capronia irregularis 
Capronia josefhafellneri 
Capronia juniperina 
Capronia kleinmondensis 
Capronia leopoldiana 
Capronia leptogii 
Capronia leucadendri 
Capronia longispora 
Capronia longonigra 
Capronia magellanica 
Capronia mansonii 
Capronia minima 
Capronia minutosetosa 
Capronia montana 
Capronia moravica 
Capronia muellerelloides 
Capronia munkii 
Capronia muriformis 
Capronia mycophila 
Capronia nigerrima 
Capronia normandinae 
Capronia obesispora 
Capronia paranectrioides 
Capronia parasitica 
Capronia perpusilla 
Capronia pilosella 
Capronia pleiospora 
Capronia polyspora 
Capronia populicola 
Capronia porothelia 
Capronia potentillae 
Capronia proteae 
Capronia pseudonormandinae 
Capronia pulcherrima 
Capronia rubiginosa 
Capronia santessoniana 
Capronia semiimmersa 
Capronia setosa 
Capronia sexdecimspora 
Capronia solitaria 
Capronia suijae 
Capronia svrcekiana 
Capronia thamnoliae 
Capronia triseptata 
Capronia vaga 
Capronia villosa

References

Eurotiomycetes
Eurotiomycetes genera
Taxa described in 1883
Taxa named by Pier Andrea Saccardo